This is a list of notable schools in Port Harcourt, the capital city of Rivers State, Nigeria. It includes both public and private schools.

 Archdeacon Crowther Memorial Girls' School, Elelenwo
 Ash Merlyn International School, Elelenwo
 Ave Maria International Academy
 Baptist High School, Borokiri
 Bereton Montessori Nursery and Primary School
 Brookstone School Secondary
 Charles Dale Memorial International School
 CITA International School
 De World International Secondary School
 Emarid College
 Emilio Piazza Memorial School
 Faith Baptist College, Old GRA
 Federal Government Girls' College, Abuloma
 Government Comprehensive Secondary School, Borokiri
 Government Secondary School, Eneka
 Greenoak International School, New GRA
 Hallel College
 Holy Rosary College
 Jephthah Comprehensive Secondary School
 Jesuit Memorial College

 La Pierre Angulaire High School
 Loretto School of Childhood, Rumuigbo
 Marygold International School, Elelenwo
 Methodist Girls High School
 Niger Delta Science School
 Norwegian International School
 Our Lady of Fatima College
 St. Benedict Immaculate Canadian Academy
 St Maria Goretti's School
 St. Mary's Catholic Model High School
 Shalom International School
 Starlets Academy, Old GRA
 Stella Maris College
 Stepping Stone Educational Centre
 Tantua International Group of Schools
 Topline Schools, Elelenwo
 Trans Amadi International School

See also
List of schools in Rivers State

References

External links

 schools
Port Harcourt
Schools